Asian Welsh people are Welsh people with Asian heritage or people with mixed Asian and Welsh heritage.

Demography 
In 2016, the Welsh Assembly of the time (now Welsh Parliament/Senedd Cymru) was criticised for not having a "Welsh Asian" tick box for polling purposes on an equalities form issued in Wales, by the Welsh Assembly.

The second largest "high-level" ethnicity category in Wales in 2021 was “Asian, Asian Welsh or Asian British”.  89,000 people identified as this category, which is 2.9% of the Welsh population. This compares to 2.3% in 2011.

Notable Asian Welsh people

Acting and film 

 Banita Sandhu
 Danielle Bux
 Jessica Sula
 Sally El Hosaini

Art 

 Alia Syed

Authors 

 Shereen El Feki

Business 

 Shelim Hussain
 Albert Gubay

Medical 

 David Nott

Politics 

 Natasha Asghar
 Mohammad Asghar
 Neil McEvoy

Singing 

 Andy Scott-Lee
 Lisa Scott-Lee

Sport 

 Neil Taylor (footballer)
 Prem Sisodiya
 Kishan Hirani
 Anoma Sooriyaarachchi
 Kieffer Moore
 Kaid Mohamed
 Barry Jones (boxer)
 Mika Chunuonsee
 Tom Ramasut
 Clive Rees
 Tal Dunne
 Adam Mekki

Tevevision and radio 

 Jason Mohammad
 Marc Edwards (TV presenter)

Other 

 Abbas Farid
 Sabrina Cohen-Hatton

In popular culture 
The Indian Doctor, is a BBC comedy drama set in a 1960s Welsh mining village of Trefelin which shows the impact that a Delhi graduate has on the village.

References 

Welsh people of Asian descent